Agia Triada is a village and a community of the Thermaikos municipality. Before the 2011 local government reform it was part of the municipality of Thermaikos, of which it was a municipal district. The 2011 census recorded 3,023 inhabitants in the village. The community of Agia Triada covers an area of 5.075 km2.

See also

List of settlements in the Thessaloniki regional unit

Website
Official Website of Agia Triada Thermaikos: www.agiatriada.eu

Populated places in Thessaloniki (regional unit)